BD-1047 is a sigma receptor antagonist, selective for the σ1 subtype. It has effects in animal studies suggestive of antipsychotic activity and may also be useful in the treatment of neuropathic pain.

More recent studies also suggest a novel role for BD-1047 in attenuating ethanol-induced neurotoxicity in vitro, and additional research is being conducted on this compound as a possible pharmacotherapy for alcohol use disorder (AUD)

References

Sigma antagonists